Harvey Santana (born July 10, 1972) is an American politician and urban planner who served as a member of the Michigan House of Representatives from 2011 to 2016.

Career

Early career 
Prior to his election to the Legislature, Santana served in the United States Navy, serving overseas in Operation Desert Shield/Desert
Storm, Bosnia, Somalia and Haiti. Santana was a transportation planner for an engineering firm in the private sector. He was president of the Warrendale Community Organization and served as a legislative assistant to Detroit City Council President Kenneth Cockrel Jr.

Politics 
Santana entered a crowded, nine-person field for the Democratic nomination in the 10th District in the Michigan House of Representatives to succeed state incumbent Gabe Leland, who was term-limited. Santana was announced as the winner of election night, taking 35 percent, beating his nearest opponent Stacy Pugh, by just 82 votes. Due to the small margin of his victory, Pugh requested a recount. Santana was later declared the winner by the State's Board of Canvassers, defeating Pugh by 85 votes.

In December 2011, Santana made headlines when he lunged at fellow Democratic state Rep. David Nathan during a heated exchange on the House floor. After the altercation, Santana was temporarily removed from the House floor and the rest of the chamber was ordered to stay at their desks, which was termed by some at the state Capitol as an "adult time-out."

In 2015, Santana was expelled from the Democratic caucus in the Michigan House of Representatives for accepting a committee assignment from Republican House Speaker Kevin Cotter that House Minority Leader Tim Greimel wanted to go to Rep. Brandon Dillon. Santana criticized House Democratic leadership and despite being removed from the caucus, he would continue to work with Democrats and Republicans to best serve the interests of his district.

Later career 
In January 2017, Santana was tapped by Governor Rick Snyder to work in the Office of Urban Initiatives. His work focused on assisting members of the Detroit caucus advance legislation as well as corrections reform.

Santana transitioned his political career into law enforcement and became a Wayne County Sheriff Deputy in 2018.

Election results

References

1972 births
Living people
Democratic Party members of the Michigan House of Representatives
Politicians from Detroit
Eastern Michigan University alumni
United States Navy personnel of the Gulf War
Military personnel from Michigan
Hispanic and Latino American state legislators
21st-century American politicians